Charles Vannerom (born 9 July 1896, date of death unknown) was a Belgian modern pentathlete. He competed at the 1928 Summer Olympics.

References

1896 births
Year of death unknown
Belgian male modern pentathletes
Olympic modern pentathletes of Belgium
Modern pentathletes at the 1928 Summer Olympics